Kleptocracy (from Greek κλέπτης kléptēs, "thief", κλέπτω kléptō, "I steal", and -κρατία -kratía from κράτος krátos, "power, rule") is a government whose corrupt leaders (kleptocrats) use political power to expropriate the wealth of the people and land they govern, typically by embezzling or misappropriating government funds at the expense of the wider population. Thievocracy means literally the rule by thievery and is a term used synonymously to kleptocracy. One feature of political-based socioeconomic thievery is that there is often no public announcement explaining or apologizing for misappropriations, nor any legal charges or punishment levied against the offenders.

Kleptocracy is different from plutocracy (rule by the richest) and oligarchy (rule by a small elite). In a kleptocracy, corrupt politicians enrich themselves secretly outside the rule of law, through kickbacks, bribes, and special favors from lobbyists and corporations, or they simply direct state funds to themselves and their associates. Also, kleptocrats often export much of their profits to foreign nations in anticipation of losing power.

According to the "Oxford English Dictionary", the first use in English occurs in the publication "Indicator" of 1819: "Titular ornaments, common to Spanish kleptocracy."

Characteristics
Kleptocracies are generally associated with dictatorships, oligarchies, military juntas, or other forms of autocratic and nepotist governments in which external oversight is impossible or does not exist. They can also be found in liberal democracies with crony capitalism. This lack of oversight can be caused or exacerbated by the ability of the kleptocratic officials to control both the supply of public funds and the means of disbursal for those funds.

Kleptocratic rulers often treat their country's treasury as a source of personal wealth, spending funds on luxury goods and extravagances as they see fit. Many kleptocratic rulers secretly transfer public funds into hidden personal numbered bank accounts in foreign countries to provide for themselves if removed from power.

Kleptocracy is most common in developing countries and collapsing nations whose economies are reliant on the trade of natural resources. Developing nations' reliance on export incomes constitute a form of economic rent and are easier to siphon off without causing the income to decrease. This leads to wealth accumulation for the elites and corruption may serve a beneficial purpose by generating more wealth for the state.

In a collapsing nation, reliance on imports from foreign countries becomes likely as the nation's internal resources become exhausted, thereby contractually obligating themselves to trading partners. This leads to kleptocracy as the elites make deals with foreign adversaries to keep the status quo for as long as possible.

To some observers, a thievery society allows the politically connected to redirect wealth to those deemed worthier by state apparatchiks. According to some pundits, one reason governmental bodies subscribe to theft-prone policies is to lay the groundwork for the socialization of labor and property in an effort to permit thievocrats to make the populace "subservient to an institutionalized authority." Newspaper columnist Paul Greenberg, in writing against the idea of the United States sending large amounts of foreign aid to Poland in 1989, argued that Poland was emerging from "40 years of a Communist thievocracy that has obliterated not only economic progress but also the idea of a modern economy."

A specific case of kleptocracy is Raubwirtschaft, German for "plunder economy" or "rapine economy", where the whole economy of the state is based on robbery, looting and plundering the conquered territories. Such states are either in continuous warfare with their neighbours or they simply milk their subjects as long as they have any taxable assets. Arnold Toynbee has claimed the Roman Empire was a Raubwirtschaft.

Financial system 

Contemporary studies have identified 21st century kleptocracy as a global financial system based on money laundering, which "depends on the services of the world's largest banks and expert financial professionals". The International Monetary Fund has suggested it could be a consensus of estimates, that money laundering made up 2–5 percent of the global economy in 1998. Kleptocrats engage in money laundering to obscure the corrupt origins of their wealth and safeguard it from domestic threats such as economic instability and predatory kleptocratic rivals. They are then able to secure this wealth in assets and investments within more stable jurisdictions, where it can then be stored for personal use, returned to the country of origin to support the kleptocrat's domestic activities, or deployed elsewhere to protect and project the regime's interests overseas.

Kleptocrats abuse the freedoms found in Western countries by transferring funds out of a kleptocracy and into Western jurisdictions for money laundering and asset security. Since 2011, more than $1 trillion has left developing countries annually in illicit financial outflows. A 2016 study found that $12 trillion had been siphoned out of the kleptocracies of Russia, China, and developing economies. Western professional services providers are taken advantage of by kleptocratic Russians and Chinese, exploiting legal and financial loopholes in the West to facilitate transnational money laundering. The kleptocratic financial system typically comprises four steps according to one opinion.

First, kleptocrats or those operating on their behalf create anonymous shell companies to conceal the origins and ownership of the funds. Multiple interlocking networks of anonymous shell companies may be created and nominee directors appointed to further conceal the kleptocrat as the ultimate beneficial owner of the funds.

Second, kleptocrats violate Western laws when they illegally transfer funds into the Western financial system.

Third, financial transactions conducted by the kleptocrat in a Western country complete the integration of the funds. Once a kleptocrat has purchased an asset this can then be resold, providing a defensible albeit illegal origin of the funds. This is known as money laundering and is illegal throughout the Western world. Research has shown the purchase of luxury real estate to be a particularly favored method, especially by Chinese and Russian kleptocrats.

Fourth, according to a British tabloid, kleptocrats may use their illegally laundered funds to engage in reputation laundering, hiring public relations firms to present a positive public image and lawyers to suppress journalistic scrutiny of their political connections and origins of their wealth.

In a 2011 forensic study of grand corruption cases, the World Bank found the United States was the leading victim of illegal incorporation of entities involved in money laundering schemes. The Department of Treasury estimates that $300 billion is laundered annually in the United States in violation of US law.

This kleptocratic financial system flourishes in the United States by illegally abusing the United States' liberal economic structure for two reasons.

First, the United States does not have a beneficial ownership registry, and kleptocrats take advantage of this privacy benefit.

Second, kleptocrats take advantage of incorporation agents, lawyers, and realtors to unknowingly lauder their money.

Currently, there are only around 1,200 money laundering convictions per year in the United States and money launderers face a less than five percent chance of conviction. Raymond Baker estimates that law enforcement fails in 99.9% of cases to detect money laundering by kleptocrats and other financial criminals.

Other Western jurisdictions favoured by kleptocrats include South Africa, the United Kingdom, and its dependencies, especially the British Virgin Islands, the Cayman Islands, Guernsey, and Jersey. Jurisdictions in the European Union which are particularly favoured by kleptocrats include Cyprus, the Netherlands, and its dependency the Dutch Antilles.

Political and corporate kleptomania
Other forms of a thievery society that can induce a "culture of systematic fraud" has been described as "political and corporate kleptomania." In this case the plunder and looting enriches not only high government officials, but a narrow class of plutocrats, who usually represent wealthy individuals and families who have amassed great assets through the usage of political favoritism, special interest legislation, monopolies, special tax breaks, state intervention, subsidies or outright graft. This type of economic system of political spoils is sometimes referred to as crony capitalism.

Effects
The effects of a kleptocratic regime or government on a nation are typically adverse in regards to the welfare of the state's economy, political affairs, and civil rights. Kleptocratic governance typically ruins prospects of foreign investment and drastically weakens the domestic market and cross-border trade. As kleptocracies often embezzle money from their citizens by misusing funds derived from tax payments, or engage heavily in money laundering schemes, they tend to heavily degrade quality of life for citizens.

In addition, the money that kleptocrats steal is diverted from funds earmarked for public amenities such as the building of hospitals, schools, roads, parks – having further adverse effects on the quality of life of citizens. The informal oligarchy that results from a kleptocratic elite subverts democracy (or any other political format).

Examples
The political system in Russia has been described as a Mafia state where president Vladimir Putin serves as the "head of the clan".

In early 2004, the German anti-corruption NGO Transparency International released a list of ten self-enriching leaders in the two decades previous to the report. Transparency International acknowledged that they were "not necessarily the 10 most corrupt leaders" and noting that "very little is known about the amounts actually embezzled".

In descending order of amount allegedly stolen (converted to United States dollars), they were:

 Former Indonesian President Suharto ($15 billion to $35 billion)
 Former Philippine President Ferdinand Marcos ($5 billion to $10 billion)
 Former Zairian President Mobutu Sese Seko ($5 billion)
 Former Nigerian Head of State Sani Abacha ($2 billion to $5 billion)
 Former Yugoslav President Slobodan Milošević ($1 billion)
 Former Haitian President Jean-Claude Duvalier ($300 million to $800 million)
 Former Peruvian President Alberto Fujimori ($600 million)
 Former Ukrainian Prime Minister Pavlo Lazarenko ($114 million to $200 million)
 Former Nicaraguan President Arnoldo Alemán ($100 million)
 Former Philippine President Joseph Estrada ($78 million to $80 million)

Narcokleptocracy

A narcokleptocracy is a society in which criminals involved in the trade of narcotics have undue influence in the governance of a state. For instance, the term was used to describe the regime of Manuel Noriega in Panama in a report prepared by a subcommittee of the United States Senate Committee on Foreign Relations chaired by Massachusetts Senator John Kerry.

In 2020, the United States charged the president of Venezuela, Nicolas Maduro with Drug Trafficking, as well as many officials and head figures of his administration.

See also
 
 
 
 Global Witness
 Group of States Against Corruption
 International Anti-Corruption Academy
 International Anti-Corruption Day
 
 
 
 
 Paradise Papers
 
 United Nations Convention against Corruption

References
Notes

Further reading
 

Political corruption
Pejorative terms for forms of government
Wealth concentration
Oligarchy